The 376th Parachute Field Artillery Battalion (376th PFAB) (later redesignated the 376th Airborne Field Artillery Battalion) is an inactive airborne field artillery battalion of the United States Army. Active with the 82nd Airborne Division from 1942–1957, the 376th PFAB saw action during World War II in Sicily, Italy, the Netherlands, the Battle of the Bulge, and Germany, often serving in support of the 504th Parachute Infantry Regimental Combat Team.

History

The 376th PFAB was activated using cadre from the Parachute Test Battery. The initial battalion commander was Major Paul Wright. The battalion was composed of five batteries: Headquarters Battery, three batteries (Batteries A, B, and C) of four 75mm pack howitzers, and Battery D, and antiaircraft/antitank battery with 37mm antitank guns and .50cal machine guns. In October 1942, Major Wright assumed command of the 320th Glider Field Artillery Battalion, and Captain Robert Neptune assumed command. In January 1943, Major Wilbur Griffith assumed command, and now-Major Neptune returned to his duties as battalion executive officer. In April 1943, the battalion departed Fort Bragg, and  staged at Camp Edwards, Massachusetts before departing New York Port of Embarkation on the George Washington. The battalion arrived at Casablanca on 10 May 1943, and staged there briefly before moving to Oujda, French Morocco. There the battalion, the 504th Regimental Combat Team and the 82nd Airborne Division trained in miserable conditions until before moving to Kairouan, Tunisia on 1–2 July.

En route from North Africa to Sicily with the 504th PIR on 11 July 1943, the battalion was heavily damaged by friendly fire, with 24 killed and 11 missing.

Lineage & Honors

Lineage
Constituted 15 August 1942 in the Army of the United States as the 376th Parachute Field Artillery Battalion and assigned to the 82nd Airborne Division
Activated 16 August 1942 at Camp Claiborne, Louisiana
Redesignated 15 December 1947 as the 376th Airborne Field Artillery Battalion
Allotted 15 November 1948 to the Regular Army
Inactivated 1 September 1957 at Fort Bragg, North Carolina

Campaign Participation Credit
World War II: Sicily (with arrowhead); Naples-Foggia; Anzio; Rome-Arno; Normandy; Rhineland (with arrowhead); Ardennes-Alsace; Central Europe

Decorations
Netherlands Military Order of William (Degree of the Knight of the Fourth Class), streamer embroidered NIJMEGEN 1944
Netherlands Orange Lanyard
Belgian Fourragere 1940
Cited in the Order of the Day of the Belgian Army for action in the Ardennes
Cited in the Order of the Day of the Belgian Army for action in Belgium and Germany

Heraldry

Distinctive Unit Insignia

Description/Blazon: A Gold color metal and enamel device 1 1/8 inches (2.86 cm) in height overall consisting of a shield blazoned: Gules an open parachute Or, charged with a projectile fesswise Azure; upon the umbrella's cords a dexter clenched gauntlet, thumb to chief of the second. Attached below and to the sides of the shield a Gold scroll inscribed "LOOK OUT BELOW" in Red letters.
Symbolism: The scarlet is for the Field Artillery. The open parachute alludes to  the functions of the Battalion; the blue projectile to the caliber of the organization's fire. The strong right hand of the personnel is representative of their trustworthiness. The motto is in the nature of a warning to enemy objectives.
Background: The distinctive unit insignia was originally approved for the 376th Parachute Field Artillery Battalion on 22 January 1943. It was redesignated for the 376th Airborne Field Artillery Battalion on 14 July 1952.

Coat of Arms

Description/Blazon
Shield: Gules an open parachute Or, charged with a projectile fesswise Axure; upon the umbrella's cords a dexter clenched gauntlet, thumb to chief of the second
Crest: None
Motto: LOOK OUT BELOW

References

376
F 376
F 376